Arif Moinuddin is a Bangladesh Nationalist Party politician and the former Member of Parliament of Chittagong-9.

Career
Moinuddin was elected to parliament from Chittagong-9 as a Bangladesh Nationalist Party candidate in 1979.

References

Bangladesh Nationalist Party politicians
Living people
2nd Jatiya Sangsad members
Year of birth missing (living people)